Kāneaka Hōlua Slide  which is better known today as the Keauhou Hōlua Slide is located in Keauhou (original name of this area was Kahaluʻu) on the island of Hawaii.  It is the largest remaining hōlua course left in the islands, which needs to be better maintained and preserved as a usable hōlua course. This particular kahua hōlua (hōlua slide) was used in the extremely dangerous activity of sliding across solidified lava surface. 

Though many had believed for years that this ritualistic practice was restricted to the alii class of men, this is not the case. The majority of oral and written histories of heʻehōlua prior to missionary/western influence was inclusive of the female as well as the male nobility of ancient Hawaii. Contrary to popular belief, heʻehōlua was widely practiced among all the Kanaka Maoli (Native Hawaiian) community throughout the paeʻāina (Kingdom). This particular hōlua course was primarily used for ritualistic purposes, but perhaps there were times when it was openly used. There are several burials found throughout the slide area suggesting that injuries and death were common when sliding down this particular course. The slide course ended on the shoreline at Heʻeia Bay. Small portions of the hōlua course are still remain on the shoreline at the end of the hōlua slide where the waves meet the rock coastline. When constructed it was first layered with large slabs of pāhoehoe lava with smaller and smaller lava material added until the kahua hōlua was finished off with a fine ash surface to cover those larger pieces of lava rock. When in use, it was covered lightly with pili grass (native to the islands) to provide a medium surface to minimize the friction between the papahōlua and lava rock surface during the practice of heʻehōlua. Today, there is one usable kahua hōlua slide that was constructed in 2011 and is located at Turtle Bay Resort, Kahuku, Oʻahu. Other than that heʻehōlua is practiced today in pastures on the high slopes of Hawaiʻi Island and Maui, as well as on groomed grass hills throughout Hawaiʻi.

This particular site was connected to the Makahiki games. It can be seen from Alii Highway, across from the Kona Country Club golf course clubhouse. The slide originally went into Heʻeia Bay, but the part below the road was destroyed and is now used by a golf course and vacation homes. The preserved parts above the road are best viewed from the air, e.g. satellite images at 
This area was used by the royal families such as the King Kamehameha III and King David Kalākaua.

By the 1950s trees and shrubs were encroaching on the sides of the slide, and sections had settled due to earthquakes. It was added to the list of National Historic Landmarks in Hawaii on December 29, 1962, and added to the National Register of Historic Places listings on the island of Hawaii on October 15, 1966.
A small museum at the nearby Keauhou Shopping Center includes a reproduction of a hōlua sled and more information about the other historic sites in the area.

See also
Hawaiian lava sledding
List of National Historic Landmarks in Hawaii
National Register of Historic Places listings in Hawaii County, Hawaii

References

National Historic Landmarks in Hawaii
Geography of Hawaii (island)
History of Hawaii (island)
National Register of Historic Places in Hawaii County, Hawaii